Stefan Dinchev Yanev is a retired Bulgarian Army Brigade general and a politician. He was from 12 May to 13 December 2021 acting deputy prime minister, acting minister of defense and caretaker government Prime Minister of Bulgaria.

Early life 
He was born on 1 March 1960 in the Popovitsa, Plovdiv Province. In 1979, he graduated from the Technical High School of Electrical Engineering in Plovdiv. Yanev graduated from the artillery military school in Shumen (now a faculty of the Vasil Levski National Military University) and began building a career in the army in 1983, when he was appointed commander of an artillery platoon in Asenovgrad.

Military career
Yanev was a commander of rocket artillery division in the 4th Army Artillery Regiment in Asenovgrad (1993–1996).

Between 1996 and 1998 he was a senior expert in the International Cooperation Department of the Ministry of Defense. He worked as an analysis officer at the PfP Coordination Group's Planning and Programming Department in Belgium (1998–2000). From 2000 to 2001 he was a senior assistant chief in the Strategic Planning Department of the General Staff of the Bulgarian Army.

Between 2001 and 2002 he was a state expert in the Euro-Atlantic Integration Directorate in the Ministry of Defense. Until 2004 he was head of a department in the Euro-Atlantic Integration Directorate in the Ministry of Defense.

Yanev graduated from the National Defense University in Washington.

From 2005 to 2007, he was Head of the Transformation Department at the NATO Counter-Terrorism Center in Ankara.

From 2007–2010, he was the Director of the Defense Policy Directorate at the Ministry of Defense.

On 1 July 2009, he was appointed Director of the Security and Defense Policy Directorate and awarded the rank of Brigadier General.

On 3 May 2010 he was appointed Director of the Defense Policy Directorate, effective as of 25 May On 24 February 2011 he was relieved of his post, serving later as the military attaché to the United States.

On 2 May 2014, he became the head of the Vasil Levski National Military University. He was relieved on the ninth of the following month, as well as dismissed from military service, as of 9 June 2014.

Political career 
From 27 January to 4 May 2017 he was Deputy Prime Minister and Minister of Defense of the Republic of Bulgaria in the caretaker government of Ognyan Gerdzhikov, and subsequently Secretary of Security and Defense of President Rumen Radev.

Prime Minister (2021) 
He was appointed to the post of Prime Minister of Bulgaria by President Rumen Radev on 12 May 2021, succeeding Boyko Borisov. He headed consequently two governments, the first from May to September and the second from September to December. He was succeeded by Kiril Petkov on 13 December 2021.

Defence Minister (2022) 
Yanev was dismissed from his post as Minister of Defense by Petkov, because the latter had introduced a political taboo on the use of Russian narratives, including the "special operation" label favoured by Vladimir Putin to refer to the 2022 Russian invasion of Ukraine. Yanev, who declared following Putin that it is not "war" in Ukraine but a "military operation", was dismissed on 1 March, a week after the start of the invasion.

Bulgarian Rise 
After being ousted as defence minister, Yanev became critical of the government and founded his own party named Bulgarian Rise on 5 May. He also assumed the role as leader of the party.

Military ranks 

 Lieutenant (1983)
 Senior Lieutenant (1985)
 Captain (1989)
 Major (1994)
 Lieutenant Colonel (1999) 
 Colonel (2004)
 Brigadier General (2009)

References

|-

|-

|-

1960 births
Living people
Bulgarian conservatives
Bulgarian engineers
Bulgarian nationalists
People from Plovdiv Province
Deputy prime ministers of Bulgaria
Prime Ministers of Bulgaria
Bulgarian generals
20th-century Bulgarian military personnel
21st-century Bulgarian military personnel
Defence ministers of Bulgaria